The ARIA Music Award for Best World Music Album, is an award presented within the Fine Arts Awards at the annual ARIA Music Awards. It was inaugurated in 1995 as Best Folk/World/Traditional Release. The ARIA Awards recognise "the many achievements of Aussie artists across all music genres", and have been given by the Australian Recording Industry Association (ARIA) since 1987.

Album recordings by a group or solo artist are eligible. The award is handed out for an indigenous, ethnic, folk or cross-cultural recording, and cannot be entered into any other genre category. The final nominees and winner are chosen by a judging school, which comprises between 40 and 100 members of representatives experienced in this genre.

Oud virtuoso Joseph Tawadros has won the category five times from sixteen nominations, Yolngu singer-songwriter-guitarist Geoffrey Gurrumul Yunupingu won four times, while gypsy fusion band Monsieur Camembert have won the award three times.

Nominees and winners

In the following table, the winner is highlighted in a separate colour, and in boldface; the nominees are those that are not highlighted or in boldface.

Notes

A: The musical artists featured on Tribal Heart are: Blek Bala Mujik, Moana and the Moahunters, Fontom From, Willie Hona, I Land, Joe T (Richmond Acheampong), Larry Maluma and Kalimba, Valanga Khoza and Saffika, Herbs, Ron Jemmott and Un Tabu, Shango, Denis Gonzalez, Dee Cee Lewis and The Crew, Barike, Musiki Manjaroa and Kakalika.

B: The musical artists featured on Womadelaide 1995 are: Sunrize Band, Zap Mama, Vika and Linda Bull, Hukwe Zawose, Rough Image, Mouth Music, Jah Wobble's Invaders of the Heart, Justin Vali Trio, Sierra Maestra, Geoffrey Oryema, Nusrat Fateh Ali Khan and Yungchen Lhamo.

C: The following musical artists are featured on Corroboration: Deborah Cheetham, Wicked Beat Sound System, Kylie Minogue, Jimmy Little, Jodi Cockatoo Creed, george, The Cruel Sea, Native Ryme, Kev Carmody, Augie March, Archie Roach, Ruby Hunter, Little G, Pound System, Primary, NoKTuRNL, Frank Yamma, David Bridie, Pnau, Stiff Gins, Billie Court, Friendly, Magic Dirt and Richard Frankland.

D: The following music artists are featured on This Is the Place For a Song: Frank Yamma, Vardos, Dili Allstars, Khalli Gudaz, Fazilla Hijeb, Ramen Nawa, Kavisha Mazzella, Mach Pelican, CDB, Inka Marca, Revolucion Street, Neil Nghi Ta, le Nghiem Tran, Dung Nguyen, Musiki Manjaro, Greg Ulfan, Polish Larsen, Takouni and The Five Venoms.

E: The following music artists are featured on Mélodie Française: Gossling, Oh Mercy, The Jezabels, Dappled Cities, Katie Noonan, Lisa Mitchell, Kate Miller-Heidke, Thelma Plum, Husky, Deep Sea Arcade, Megan Washington, Vance Joy, Jonathan Boulet, Edward Deer, Jinja Safari, Okenyo, Big Scary, The Walking Who and Soko.

References

External links

W
World music awards
Album awards